Pezhma is a rural locality (a selo) and the administrative center of Pezhemskoye Rural Settlement of Velsky District, Arkhangelsk Oblast, Russia. The population was 585 as of 2014. There are 13 streets.

Geography 
Pezhma is located 23 km southwest of Velsk (the district's administrative centre) by road. Krylovo is the nearest rural locality.

References 

Rural localities in Velsky District